The 2017 TCR Asia Series season is the third season of the TCR Asia Series.

Teams and drivers

Calendar and results
The 2017 initial schedule was announced on 8 November 2016, with six events scheduled. On 2 February 2017, the 2017 schedule has changed with the entry of Zhuhai events. On 29 March 2017, the calendar was once again changed with Zhuhai replacing the round in Thailand held at the Chang International Circuit, Zhejiang and Shanghai will also switch places on the calendar. The Macau round was also removed.

Championship standings

Drivers' championship

Teams' championship

Car model of the year

Notes

References

External links
 

Asia Series
TCR Asia Series season